The Franklin Street-College Avenue Residential Historic District is a historic district in Hartwell, Georgia which was listed on the National Register of Historic Places in 1986.

The district is roughly bounded by Johnson, Maple, Franklin and First, and Carter Sts. It includes some commercial buildings and the brick Works Progress Administration-built community clubhouse at the corner of Howell and Richardson, as well as Victoria eclectic and Craftsman bungalow houses.

References

Historic districts on the National Register of Historic Places in Georgia (U.S. state)
Victorian architecture in Georgia (U.S. state)
Houses in Hart County, Georgia
National Register of Historic Places in Hart County, Georgia
Hartwell, Georgia